Hsieh Cheng-peng and Yang Tsung-hua won the title by defeating Vasek Pospisil and César Ramírez 3–6, 7–5, [10–5] in the final.

Seeds

Draw

Finals

Top half

Bottom half

External links
Main Draw

Boys' Doubles
2008 Boys' Doubles